The Score is the second and final studio album by the hip hop trio Fugees. The Score was released worldwide on February 13, 1996, on Columbia Records. The album features a wide range of samples and instrumentation, with many aspects of alternative hip hop that would come to dominate the hip-hop music scene in the mid- to late 1990s. Primarily, The Score's production was handled by the Fugees themselves, Jerry Duplessis and Warren Riker, with additional production from Salaam Remi, John Forté, Diamond D, and Shawn King. The album's guest verses are from Outsidaz members Rah Digga, Young Zee, and Pacewon, as well as Omega, John Forté, and Diamond D. Most versions of the album feature four bonus tracks, including three remixes of "Fu-Gee-La", and a short acoustic Wyclef Jean solo track entitled "Mista Mista".

Upon its release, The Score was a commercial success, peaking atop the U.S. Billboard 200, and became the third best selling album of 1996. It also topped the Top R&B/Hip-hop Albums chart for eight weeks, becoming the longest running number one for a hip hop group, and topped the 1996 year-end chart. The singles "Killing Me Softly", "Fu-Gee-La", and "Ready or Not" also achieved notable chart success, helping the group achieve worldwide recognition.

The album received mostly favorable reviews. It received a nomination for Album of the Year at the 39th Grammy Awards, becoming the second rap album to receive a nomination and the first for a hip hop group; and won the Grammy Award for Best Rap Album, along with Best R&B Performance by a Duo or Group with Vocal for "Killing Me Softly". In retrospect, The Score has garnered a considerable amount of acclaim over the years, with many music critics and publications noting it as one of the greatest albums of the 1990s, as well as one of the greatest hip hop albums of all time. The Score was included in The Source's 100 best rap albums list (1998), and was ranked number 134 on Rolling Stone's revised list of "The 500 Greatest Albums of All Time" (2020).

As of February 2021, The Score has been certified seven times platinum by the Recording Industry Association of America (RIAA). It is the best-selling album by an American hip hop act in France, where the album has been certified Diamond. With an estimated 22 million copies sold worldwide, the album has become one of the best-selling albums of all time, at the time of its release it briefly became the best-selling hip hop album of all time, and remains the best-selling album by a hip hop group. As of June 2021, the album is the fifth-most streamed 1990s hip-hop album on Spotify.

Background 
Although the Fugees' previous album, Blunted on Reality proved to be critically and commercially unsuccessful, Chris Schwartz, the head of Ruffhouse Records, decided to give the group another chance. In early 1995, he gave them a $135,000 advance and granted them complete artistic control for a follow-up album. The group used the money for recording equipment and set up a studio in Wyclef Jean's uncle's basement, which they referred to as the Booga Basement.

Recording for the album began in June 1995, and extended into November 1995 at what Jean described as a "relaxed pace... It was done calmly, almost unconsciously. There wasn't any pressure - it was like 'let's make some music,' and it just started forming into something amazing. It sounded like a feel-good hip hop record to us, and it was different than what anyone was doing at the time. It was three kids from an urban background expressing themselves."

In regard to The Scores unified themes and production, Lauryn Hill commented: "It's an audio film. It's like how radio was back in the 1940s. It tells a story, and there are cuts and breaks in the music. It's almost like a hip hop version of Tommy, like what The Who did for rock music."

Music 
The Score was produced by a variety of producers including each member of the Fugees, as well as Diamond D, Salaam Remi, and Jerry Duplessis. Although most tracks are built on sampled melodies, live instrumentation and DJing are incorporated into multiple tracks. Wyclef Jean plays the guitar on "Family Business", while DJ Scribble scratches on "Manifest/Outro". Nevertheless, samples are the predominant production tool on The Score. "Fu-Gee-La" incorporates a sample of Teena Marie's "Ooo La La La", and is interpolated in the song's chorus. "Ready or Not" also contains a sample that is interpolated; "Ready or Not (Here I Come)" by The Delfonics. "Manifest/Outro" contains a sample from "Rock Dis Funky Joint" by Poor Righteous Teachers, while the title track, "Red Intro" contains vocal samples from every track on the entire album.

Three official singles were released in promotion of The Score, the first of which was "Fu-Gee-La", which was released on January 9, 1996, reached the Top 40, peaking at No. 29 on the Billboard Hot 100. Additionally, the song reached No. 13 on the Hot R&B/Hip-Hop Songs, and No. 2 on the Hot Rap Songs chart. "Fu-Gee-La" was produced by Salaam Remi and includes elements of "Ooo La La La" as performed by Teena Marie.

The second single, "Killing Me Softly", with lead vocals by Lauryn Hill, was released on May 31, 1996. "Killing Me Softly" proved to be the most successful single from the album. The song went No. 1 in 20 countries, including the United Kingdom, where it peaked atop the UK Singles Chart, and became one of the region's best-selling singles ever. In the US the song wasn’t available for purchase, which made it ineligible to chart on the Billboard Hot 100 chart due to their previous rules; however it still managed to peak at No. 1 on the US Mainstream Top 40 and Rhythmic airplay charts. Initially, the song was to be titled "Killing Them Softly", and though alluding to Charles Fox and Norman Gimbel's "Killing Me Softly with His Song", it was originally not intended to be a cover; however, the original writers refused permission for the rewrite of their song, but did allow the Fugees to do a cover version. In 1997, "Killing Me Softly" won the Fugees a Grammy Award for Best R&B Performance by Duo or group.

The third single released from the album was "Ready or Not", which was released on September 2, 1996. In the US the song peaked at No. 34 on the Rhythmic Top 40 chart. The song became their second No. 1 on the UK Singles Chart, staying at the top for two weeks. The track interpolates "Ready or Not, Here I Come (Can't Hide from Love)" as performed by The Delfonics, and also samples Enya's "Boadicea". Initially this sample was uncredited, and Enya was prepared to sue for copyright infringement, but decided not to when she discovered that the Fugees were not gangsta rappers.

The accompanying music video was directed by film director Marcus Nispel, and was reported to have cost approximately 1.3 million dollars at the time, making it one of the most expensive music videos ever. In a later interview, Fugees member Pras described the recording of "Ready or Not", stating, "The three of us was each going through some pain. Lauryn was crying when she did her vocals. It was unbelievable. To see her singing with tears coming out of her eyes, it made me want to cry too."

The fourth and final single from the album, a cover of Bob Marley's "No Woman, No Cry", with lead vocals by Wyclef Jean, was released on November 18, 1996. It was produced by Wyclef Jean and Lauryn Hill, with additionally production from Pras and Jerry 'Wonder' Duplessis. It features uncredited backing vocals from by Marley's children Stephen and Sharon Marley, as well as reggae singer Pam Hall. An official remix of the track, featuring Stephen Marley, was included on the group's third release, Bootleg Versions. The song peaked at No. 38 on the US Hot 100 Airplay chart. It was more successful worldwide, peaking atop the New Zealand Singles Chart for two weeks, and No. 2 in the UK.

Critical reception 

Upon its release, The Score received critical acclaim. Entertainment Weekly writer James Bernard commented, "What a shock: a smooth, well-produced rap album that doesn't have Dr. Dre's fingerprints on it [...] The Score showcases their acrobatic lyrical techniques and restless intelligence, and unlike much East Coast rap, The Score feels warm and intimate — partly because the instruments are live but also because the Fugees sound so relaxed and casual." Robert Christgau from The Village Voice called The Score "so beautiful and funny its courage could make you weep", and said the Fugees possess "black humanism" and "the gender-equality formula in which one girl learning equals two guys calling the shots". Steve Huey from AllMusic wrote that, "Even when they're not relying on easily recognizable tunes, their original material is powered by a raft of indelible hooks [...] The Score balances intelligence and accessibility with an easy assurance, and ranks as one of the most distinctive hip hop albums of its era." Cheo Hodari Coker from the Los Angeles Times wrote that, "The Score succeeds on all counts", while the Fugees are as fluid a rap group since A Tribe Called Quest: "Their specialty is matching a gymnastic rhyme flow and rock-solid beats with expert crooning." Selwyn Seyfu Hinds of Spin commented, "A sense of organic interaction is the hallmark of this album [....] the album's most important factor is its beats; chest-shaking, obscure-texture-having, freestyle-friendly beats." Q described the album as "An impressively panoramic soundscape."

However, in a mixed review, Rolling Stone writer Ann Powers commented, "The Fugees' roots in reggae gives them a solid base in song and a basic philosophy that's richer than the money-or-nothing ethic that dulls much of rap these days. Without being sanctimonious, The Score paints the ghetto as a mythical landscape, one that can inspire pride as well as sorrow. Like Wu-Tang Clan, the Fugees view the world as their movie, complete with stunts and special effects." Jon Pareles of The New York Times found the group's "vision of ghetto life" both eccentric and realistic, although he felt "Killing Me Softly" sounds "out of place amid the hard-nosed surrealism".

Awards

Accolades 
Information regarding accolades is extracted from Acclaimedmusic.net, except for accolades with additional sources.
(*) Signifies unordered lists

Track listing 

Notes
  signifies a co-producer.
 Interludes performed by Talent, Wil Shannon Briggs and Ras Baraka.
 Intro performed by Red Alert and Ras Baraka.
 Outro performed by Red Alert.

Sample credits
"Ready or Not" contains samples of "Boadicea" by Enya, "God Made Me Funky" by The Headhunters, and an interpolation of "Ready or Not, Here I Come (Can't Hide from Love)" by The Delfonics.
"Zealots" contains a sample of "I Only Have Eyes for You" by The Flamingos.
"The Beast" contains a sample of "God Made Me Funky" by The Headhunters.
"Fu-Gee-La" contains a sample of "(If Loving You Is Wrong) I Don't Want to Be Right" by Ramsey Lewis, and an interpolation of "Ooo La La La" by Teena Marie.
"Family Business" contains a sample of "Recuerdos de la Alhambra" by Francisco Tarrega, and "Gypsy Woman" by Joe Bataan (on the outro interlude).
"Killing Me Softly" covers "Killing Me Softly with His Song" by Roberta Flack, and contains samples of "Bonita Applebum" by A Tribe Called Quest, "Memory Band" by Rotary Connection, "Fool Yourself" by Little Feat, and "The Day Begins" by The Moody Blues (on the outro interlude).
"The Score" contains samples of "Dove" by Cymande, "My Melody" by Eric B. & Rakim, "Planet Rock" by Afrika Bambaataa, and "Scorpio" by Dennis Coffey and the Detroit Guitar Band (on the outro interlude).
"Cowboys" contains a sample of "Something 'Bout Love" by The Main Ingredient.
"No Woman, No Cry" covers "No Woman, No Cry" by Bob Marley & The Wailers.
"Manifest" contains a sample of "Rock Dis Funky Joint" by Poor Righteous Teachers.

Personnel 

Wyclef Jean – vocals, guitar, producer
Lauryn Hill – vocals, producer, arranger
Pras Michel – vocals, producer
John Forté – vocals, producer, drum programming
Diamond D – vocals, producer
DJ Red Alert – vocals
Omega – vocals
Pacewon – vocals
Rah Digga – vocals
Young Zee – vocals
Sly Dunbar – drums, drum programming
Ras Baraka – vocals

Robbie Shakespeare – bass
Backspin – DJ scratches
DJ Scribble – DJ scratches
Jerry Duplessis – producer
Salaam Remi – producer
Shawn King – producer
Handel Tucker – producer, keyboards
Warren Riker – recorder, engineer
Bob Brockmann – engineer
Gary Noble – engineer
Eddie Hudson – engineer, mixing
Delroy Pottinger – engineer
Courtney Small – engineer

Charts

Weekly charts

Year-end charts

Decade-end charts

Certifications

See also
 Album era
List of Billboard 200 number-one albums of 1996
List of Billboard number-one R&B albums of 1996
Billboard Year-End

Notes

References

External links
Article at Spin
Album Review at BBC Music
Album Review at RapReviews

Fugees albums
1996 albums
Albums produced by Diamond D
Albums produced by Jerry Duplessis
Albums produced by Lauryn Hill
Albums produced by Salaam Remi
Albums produced by Wyclef Jean
Columbia Records albums
Concept albums
Grammy Award for Best Rap Album
Progressive rap albums